The Bishop of Brixworth is an episcopal title used by a suffragan bishop of the Church of England Diocese of Peterborough, in the Province of Canterbury, England. The title takes its name after the village of Brixworth in Northamptonshire and has shared responsibility (with the diocesan bishop) over the whole diocese. Following a proposal initiated by Bill Westwood, Bishop of Peterborough in 1985, and with the agreement of the General Synod of the Church of England in July 1987, the See was erected by Queen-in-Council on 26 July 1988.

The role is currently held by John Holbrook since his 2 June 2011 consecration.

List of Bishops of Brixworth

References

External links
 Crockford's Clerical Directory - Listings

Bishops of Brixworth
Anglican suffragan bishops in the Diocese of Peterborough
Anglican Diocese of Peterborough